Polovinsky District is an administrative and municipal district (raion), one of the twenty-four in Kurgan Oblast, Russia. It is located in the south of the oblast. Its administrative center is the rural locality (a selo of Polovinnoye. Population:  16,295 (2002 Census);  The population of Polovinnoye accounts for 37.9% of the district's total population.

History
The district was established in 1924.

References

Notes

Sources

Districts of Kurgan Oblast

